The 1973 Italian Open was a combined men's and women's tennis tournament that was played by men on outdoor clay courts at the Foro Italico in Rome, Italy. The men's and women's tournament were part of the 1973 Commercial Union Assurance Grand Prix. It was the 30th edition of the tournament and was held from 2 June through 10 June 1973. The singles titles were won by Ilie Năstase and Evonne Goolagong.

Finals

Men's singles
 Ilie Năstase defeated  Manuel Orantes 6–1, 6–1, 6–1

Women's singles
 Evonne Goolagong defeated  Chris Evert 7–6, 6–0

Men's doubles
 John Newcombe /  Tom Okker defeated  Ross Case /  Geoff Masters 6–3, 6–2, 6–4

Women's doubles
 Virginia Wade /  Olga Morozova defeated  Renáta Tomanová /  Martina Navratilova 3–6, 6–2, 7–5

References

External links
 ITF – men's tournament edition details

Italian Open
Italian Open
Italian Open (tennis)
1973 in Italian tennis